Komsomolsky is an urban locality (an urban-type settlement) under the administrative jurisdiction of the Town of Kizlyar in the Republic of Dagestan, Russia. As of the 2010 Census, its population was 2,723.

History
Urban-type settlement status was granted to Komsomolsky in 1962.

Administrative and municipal status
Within the framework of administrative divisions, the urban-type settlement of Komsomolsky is in jurisdiction of the Town of Kizlyar. Within the framework of municipal divisions, Komsomolsky is a part of Kizlyar Urban Okrug.

References

Notes

Sources

Urban-type settlements in the Republic of Dagestan